Ritual is the second studio album by Peter Frohmader, released in 1986 by Multimood.

Track listing

Personnel
Adapted from the Ritual liner notes.
 Peter Frohmader – electronics, production, engineering, cover art
 Stephan Manus – violin (A1, A4)
 Stefan Plett – alto saxophone (B2, B3)

Release history

References

External links 
 Ritual at Discogs (list of releases)

1986 albums
Peter Frohmader albums